Bluesky is a hamlet in Alberta, Canada within the Municipal District of Fairview No. 136. It is located along Highway 2, east of Fairview in northern Alberta.

Heavy oil was discovered in a well east of the hamlet in 1952, in a geological formation named after the community, Bluesky Formation.

Demographics 

Events 
Bluefest

Notable residents 
 Hubert Brooks, RCAF officer and Olympic gold medalist

See also 
List of communities in Alberta
List of designated places in Alberta
List of hamlets in Alberta

References 

Municipal District of Fairview No. 136
Hamlets in Alberta
Designated places in Alberta